Pir Jo Goth is a city in Pakistan situated in the Kingri Taluka of Khairpur District in the Sindh Province. It is the headquarter of Kingri taluka. Its population is approximately 110,000.

History

Pir Jo Goth is mainly famous for the tomb of Muhammad Rashid (known as Roz-e-Dhani) and his descendants. Murids of Roz-e-Dahni are now called Hurs and the descendant of Roz-e-Dahani is called Pir-Pagaara. Sayed Sibgatullah Shah Rashidi(iii) is the 8th Pir Paghara. The Hurs visit the city four times in a year for Ziyarat of Pir Sahib Pagara and the tomb of Muhammad Rashid (Roz-e-Dhani). Sayed Muhammad Rashid Shah Rashidi is MPA of Pir-jo-goth (From 2013), Sayed Najebullah Shah Rashidi is chairman of Taluka Kingri (from 2015) and Abdul Gafar Memon is city chairman (From 2015). Many schools (government and private) and colleges for both boys and girls education also in city. College namely Government Boys Degree College and Government Girls Degree College provides higher education in city. And Jamia Rashidia Islamic University (non-government) for Islamic education and two Libraries (one non-government and other is government library) also in Pir-jo-goth city. And for health one civil hospital and many private hospitals in city. The city has two big bazaars namely Shahi Bazar and Thano Road. Ground and parks for also for citizen in city.  And Anaj Mandi, Sabzi Mandi, Goshat Market and Maal Piddi also in Pir-jo-goth city. Pir-jo-Goth is headquarter of Pakistan Muslim League Functional. Dates and bananas are famous fruit of Pir-Jo-Goth.

See also

References 

Populated places in Khairpur District
Populated places in Sindh
Cities in Pakistan